Llocnou de la Corona is a municipality in the comarca of Horta Sud in the Valencian Community, Spain. It is the smallest municipality in Spain, covering . , it had 130 inhabitants.

References

Municipalities in the Province of Valencia
Horta Sud